SS Cassius Hudson was a Liberty ship built in the United States during World War II. She was named after Cassius Hudson, a Farm Demonstration Agent for the North Carolina Extension Service and developer of 4-H Youth Development programs.

Construction
Cassius Hudson was laid down on 22 July 1944, under a Maritime Commission (MARCOM) contract, MC hull 2373, by J.A. Jones Construction, Brunswick, Georgia; she was sponsored by Miss Frances Hudson, and launched on 31 August 1944.

History
She was allocated to the Alcoa Steamship Co., Inc., on 14 September 1944.

References

Bibliography

 
 
 
 
 
 

 

Liberty ships
Ships built in Brunswick, Georgia
1944 ships
Ships sunk by mines
Maritime incidents in 1946